Christine Margaret Rolfes (née Nasser, born March 25, 1967) is an American politician of the Democratic Party, serving as the Washington State Senator for the 23rd District since 2011. The 23rd District includes Bainbridge Island, Silverdale, Poulsbo, Kingston, and parts of Bremerton. She focuses her work on funding and educational reform, small businesses, ferries, military and veteran families, and the environment.

Biography
Rolfes was born in New York.

Rolfes earned a BA in Economics from the University of Virginia and then an MPA from the University of Washington.

From 2000 until 2006, Rolfes served on the Bainbridge Island City Council.

From January 2007 until July 2011, Rolfes served as a Democratic representative of the 23rd district in the Washington State House of Representatives.

In July 2011, Rolfes was appointed to serve as Washington State Senator for the 23rd District. She was then elected to that position in her own right on November 6, 2012.

References 

1967 births
Living people
Democratic Party Washington (state) state senators
Democratic Party members of the Washington House of Representatives
Women state legislators in Washington (state)
21st-century American politicians
21st-century American women politicians
People from Bainbridge Island, Washington